Citron is a dark lemon color similar to that of the fruit citron. As a tertiary color on the RYB color wheel, it is an equal mix of orange and green pigments.

References

See also
Citrine (color)
List of colors

Tertiary colors
Shades of yellow
Shades of green
Shades of brown
Shades of orange